This is a list of food festivals in Wales. As a criterion, established festivals should all have a devoted website to which they are linked. Some of the food festivals are alternatively entitled Show, Fayre, Fair, Fest, Feast.

A
Abergavenny Christmas Food & Drink Fair
Abergavenny Food Festival
Aberystwyth Sea2shore Food Festival
Anglesey Oyster & Welsh Produce Festival

B
Big Cheese Festival, Caerphilly 
The Big Welsh Bite Food Festival
Bite Food Festival, Cardiff
Brecon Beacons Food Festival
Broneirion Food Fair, Llandinam
Beaumaris Food Festival

C
Caernarfon Food Festival
Caerphilly Food Festival
Cardiff International Food and Drink Festival
Cardigan Bay Seafood Festival
Cardigan River and Food Festival
Taste of Carmarthenshire Food Festival
Cowbridge Food and Drink Festival
Crymych Food Festival

D
Denbigh Plum Festival 
Dinefwr Food Festival

E
Erddig Apple Festival

F
Feastival, Bridgend

G
Gorseinon Food Festival
Gwledd Conwy Feast

H
Haverfordwest Beer and Cider Festival
Hay Summer Food Festival
Hay Winter Food Festival

L
Lampeter Food Festival
Llanelli Food and Drink Festival
Llangollen Food Festival

M
Menai Food Festival 
Merthyr Food Festival
Mold Food & Drink Festival
Monmouthshire Food Festival
Mumbles Oyster and Food Festival

N
Narberth Food Festival
Neath Food and Drink Festival
 Newcastle Emlyn Food Festival 
Newport Food Festival
Newtown Food & Drink Festival

P
Pembrokeshire Fish Week
Portmeirion Food and Craft Festival

R
Rhuddlan Food Festival

S
St Davids Really Wild Food & Countryside Festival
St David's Food Festival, Pembrey
St Fagans Food Festival

W
The Welsh Menu Live
Welsh Perry and Cider Festival
Wrexham Food Festival

References

Further reading
Food Festivals Toolkit produced by Welsh Government
Food Tourism Action Plan for Wales, 2015-2020

Food festivals
Food

United Kingdom